Kalyanamam Kalyanam is a 1974 Indian Tamil-language comedy film written and directed by K. Krishnamurthy from a story by Panchu Arunachalam. The film stars Jaishankar and Jayachitra. It was released on 12 January 1974.

Plot

Cast 
 Jaishankar
 Jayachitra
 Cho
 Sukumari
 Srikanth
 Thengai Srinivasan
 Jayakumari
 Pushpamala
 K. A. Thangavelu
 V. S. Raghavan

Production 
Latha was initially chosen to portray Jayachitra's sister; however a day before the film's launch, she informed she could not act in the film. During the launch, the producers announced that Jayachitra will play dual roles as siblings.

Soundtrack 
The soundtrack was composed by Vijaya Bhaskar.

Release and reception 
Kalyanamam Kalyanam was released on 12 January 1974, and emerged a commercial success. Kanthan of Kalki said those who did not watch Pattikada Pattanama (1972) would enjoy this. The film's success established Arunachalam as a successful screenwriter in Tamil cinema.

References

External links 
 

1970s Tamil-language films
1974 comedy films
Films scored by Vijaya Bhaskar
Films with screenplays by Panchu Arunachalam
Indian comedy films